Anathallis jamaicensis is a species of orchid plant native to Jamaica.

References 

jamaicensis
Flora of Jamaica
Flora without expected TNC conservation status